The Altos de Nsork National Park is found in Equatorial Guinea. It was established in 2000. The area is bounded on the west side by the Abang River, and on the east and south by roads; there are few roads in the park.

This park is home to many of the same wild animals that make it famous in the surrounding Gabonese forests, such as common chimpanzees, gorillas, black colobus, mandrels, forest buffaloes and red river pigs.

Topography and climate
The terrain is one of high hills, with low and dissected terraces. The area is bounded on the west side by the Abang River, and on the east and south by roads; there are few roads in the park.

References

National parks of Equatorial Guinea
Protected areas established in 2000